Signeta is a genus of skipper butterflies in the family Hesperiidae.

Species
Signeta flammeata Butler, 1882
Signeta tymbophora Meyrick & Lower, 1902

References
Natural History Museum Lepidoptera genus database
Signeta at funet

Trapezitinae
Hesperiidae genera